Efva Maria Kristina Lilja (born 1956 in Huskvarna, Sweden) is a Swedish artist and professor of choreography, working with performances, visual art, film and writing. Lilja is considered one of Sweden's most prominent choreographers and her influence on the Scandinavian dance field is incomparable.

Efva Lilja's work advocates a break with artistic labels, categories and genres. Since the 1980s, she has worked actively with critically developing the cultural politics of Sweden and abroad. Her work has been a part of developing artistic research specifically within the fields of dance and choreography.

Biography 
Efva Lilja got her professional training at Balettakademien (in Swedish) and at the University of Dance (now University of Dance and Circus) in Stockholm, where she graduated in 1980. Her subsequent training took place at the Royal Academy of Dance in England, in France and the United States. 1980-1981 she studied at the Merce Cunningham Dance Foundation in New York, where she also took composition classes with Robert Ellis Dunn and composition workshops at Columbia University, including work with Meredith Monk.

She made her debut as a choreographer in 1982. In 1985 she started E.L.D., a company where she was the Artistic Director for twenty years. At E.L.D. Lilja established a new way of working for the art of dance in Sweden. In 2006 E.L.D. became Weld, an independent platform for experimental processes and knowledge production led by Anna Koch.

Between 2006 and 2013 she was the Vice-Chancellor of the University of Dance and Circus in Stockholm, Sweden. In 2016 she became the artistic director at Dansehallerne in Copenhagen.

Works 
In collaboration with other artists, Lilja has created pioneering works that have been performed in more than thirty-five countries, at major stages, in small intimate venues, on television, films, in schools and art forums. In 1994 she produced Entre Nos Espaces on commission for the Centre Georges Pompidouin Paris. She produced A Gentle Cut in 2000 and ELDSTAD in 2003 for the Swedish Museum of Modern Art. In 2001 she produced The Illuminated Dream Aflame for the Guggenheim Museum in Bilbao.

Awards and grants 
Lilja has received a range of awards and grants for her artistic achievements in dance. She was appointed an Honorary Member of the International Centre for Cultural Relations in 1999, in 2000 she received the Prix D'ASSITEJ and in 2009 she was awarded S:t Erik Medallion (in Swedish) in commemoration of her artistic achievements by the City of Stockholm.

Bibliography 
 Words on Dance (Stockholm: ELD, 2003). OCLC 186486762
 Helene (Stockholm ELD, 2004) OCLC 486955096
 Dance – For Better, For Worse (Stockholm: ELD, 2004). OCLC 495481428
 Movement as the Memory of the Body (University College of Dance, Committee for Artistic Research and Development, 2006) OCLC 185258300
 Do You Get What I’m Not Saying – on dance as a subversive declaration of love (Lund Ellerströms, 2012). OCLC 918238688
 100 exercises for a choreographer and other survivors (Lund Ellerströms, 2012). OCLC 993538470
 DOCH 1963-2013 (DOCH School of Dance and Circus, Stockholm University of the Arts, 2013) OCLC 940869795
 Breaking the mould (DOCH School of Dance and Circus, Stockholm University of the Arts, 2014)
 Art, research, empowerment : on the artist as researcher (Stockholm Regeringskansliet, 2015). OCLC 915580398
 Choreographing the day : leaving the night alone : an apology for dance (Lund Ellerströms Förlag, 2017).

Artistic Research 
In 2003 Lilja was appointed professor at the University of Dance. Between 2002 and 2004 her research focused on Dance in a Frozen Landscape that took its starting point in a two-month polar expedition to the North Pole where she explored her abilities to dance under extreme circumstances. Between 2003 and 2006 she worked on her project Movement as The Memory of The Body, represented by three performances: The Memory (2003), Using The Eye In The Middle Of The Head (2004) and Smiling At Death (2005). She is involved in both national and international organisations in favour of artists' ability to perform research such as Society for Artistic Research (SAR) and European League of Institutes of the Arts (ELIA). She is also a lecturer and in 2006-2013 she was the Vice-Chancellor of the University of Dance and Circus (DOCH) in Stockholm.

Lilja has engaged in cultural politics in bodies such as the Swedish Dance Committee and Fylkingen (in Swedish). She was a founding member of the Association of Swedish Choreographers (FSK) in 1986 and was its first chairperson. She was the government's appointee to the governing board of the University of Dance (in Swedish) between 1994 and 1997 and was the designated expert in dance at the Swedish Ministry of Cultural Affairs (in Swedish) in 1995. During 2007-2012 she was a member of the board at the Swedish Arts Grants Committee (in Swedish). Since 2009 she is a member of the International Board for the Programme for Arts-based Research (PEEK), at Austrian Science Fund (FWF). During 2008-2010 she was an expert in an advisory board concerning artistic research at the Swedish Ministry of Education (in Swedish) and in 2014 she was appointed Expert Advisor on Artistic Research at the Swedish Ministry of Education and Research (in Swedish). In 2012 she was invited to become a member of the project Team Culture 2012initiated by the European Union, and invited by the President of the European Commission, José Manuel Barroso to be active in the project A New Narrative for Europe 2013–2014. She also took part in Forum d'Avignon 2013–2014.

Archive of Efva Lilja's artistry 
Additional biographical information and a complete list of works can be found on Efva Lilja's web site, in the Swedish National Encyclopedia, the Swedish Who's Who (in Swedish) and other reference works. Information can also be found in the archives of the Swedish Museum of Dance (in Swedish) and in the archive of the National Library of Sweden (Kungliga Biblioteket, Enheten för handskrifter, kartor och bilder. Acc.nr 2009/20).

References

External links 
 Efva Lilja's web site

Swedish choreographers
Swedish female dancers
1956 births
Living people
Balettakademien
People from Huskvarna